Arpaçbahşiş is a town in Erdemli district of Mersin Province, Turkey.

History 
The area around Arpaçbahşiş was a part of historical Cilicia Pedias (eastern part of  Cilicia, the flat Cilicia). During the domination of Ramadanid principality (a Turkmen dynasty between 13th and 16th centuries), a Turkmen tribe named Varsak settled in the area, north of the modern town of Tömük, several kilometers northeast of Arpaçbahşiş. At about 1375, a certain Elvan Bey of Varsak began controlling the area around Arpaçbahşiş. But the settlement was established much later; probably at the beginning of the 18th century, during the Ottoman era. Sarıkeçili, a Turkmen tribe from Konya, a city in central Anatolia, settled in the area. The town was named after Arpaç Hüseyin, the chief of the Sarıkeçili tribe.

In 1865, the settlement was established as a village of Mersin. In 1970, the village of Arpaçbahşiş was declared a town.

Geography 
The population is 6,010 as of 2012.

Economy 
Like most towns around, Arpaçbahşiş is an agricultural town specialized in citrus. But, lately the coastal band of Arpaçbahşiş became a summer resort. It is populated by summer houses, and services to summer houses constitute an ever increasing revenue for the town.

References 

Populated coastal places in Turkey
Seaside resorts in Turkey
Populated places in Mersin Province
Towns in Turkey
Populated places in Erdemli District